The United Arab Emirates national rugby union team competes in the annual Asia Rugby competitions. They were once part of the Arabian Gulf team which consisted of players from the Gulf Cooperation Countries on the Arabian Peninsula. In 2011 they were granted membership into the Asian Rugby Football Union and following a successful bid, were granted full membership with World Rugby. They are the newest and 100th member to do so. The current coach of the UAE national team is Apollo Perelini who has been in this role since 2015.

Rugby union in the United Arab Emirates is governed by the United Arab Emirates Rugby Federation (UAE Rugby) who oversee the ever-increasing popularity of domestic expat rugby union leagues and competitions.

The majority of the UAE National squad are selected local expat rugby players from various UAE Premiership and Division One rugby teams. To qualify to play for the national team, players need to have completed thirty six consecutive months of residence within the UAE.

Results

2016 
Asia Rugby Championship Division II - Winners

UAE 65 vs 13 Uzbekistan

Thailand 18 - 70 UAE

2015 
2015 Asian Rugby Championship Division 2 2nd (2 wins, 1 loss)

UAE 53 - 22 Thailand

UAE 19 - 20 Malaysia

UAE 16 - 12 Chinese Taipei

2014 
2014 Asian Five Nations Division 1: 1 loss.

2013 
2013 Asian Five Nations: 5th (4 losses)

2012 
2012 Asian Five Nations: 4th (1 win, 3 losses)

2011 
2011 Asian Five Nations: 3rd (1 win, 1 draw, 2 losses)

Cup of Nations

 2011 Cup of Nations: 4th (3 losses)
 2012 Cup of Nations: 4th (3 losses)

Overall Records
Their Test record against all nations:

References

Asian national rugby union teams
National sports teams of the United Arab Emirates